John William Halpin (born 15 November 1961) is a Scottish former association football player and coach, best known for his long association with Celtic.

References

External links

1961 births
Living people
Scottish footballers
Association football wingers
Armadale Thistle F.C. players
Celtic F.C. players
Carlisle United F.C. players
Rochdale A.F.C. players
Gretna F.C. players
Scottish Football League players
English Football League players
Footballers from West Lothian
Scottish Junior Football Association players
People from Dechmont